Biliary pseudolithiasis is an unusual complication of ceftriaxone where the drug complexes with calcium and mimics gallstones. It is reversed when ceftriaxone administration is stopped. It was first described in 1988 by Schaad et al. as "reversible ceftriaxone-associated biliary pseudolithiasis".

See also
Biliary sludge

References

Medical terminology
Disorders of gallbladder, biliary tract and pancreas